Mark E. Kern is a Taiwanese-American video game designer best known for being a team lead on the video game World of Warcraft and a founder of Red 5 Studios.

Creation of Red 5 Studios
Kern left Blizzard in 2006 to co-found the development company Red 5 Studios. There he worked on the title Firefall before eventually leaving the company after being voted out as CEO by the Red 5's board of directors.

Firefall Bus

Examples of reasons for why Mark Kern was removed as CEO include squandering over a million dollars on a promotional bus for the Firefall game, which never functioned correctly and is widely regarded as a significant blunder.

League For Gamers
In 2012, Kern started the League For Gamers in response to the Stop Online Piracy Act (SOPA) and the PROTECT IP Act. Kern said that the League For Gamers would stand as an advocacy group for the gaming community. He intended it to rival the Entertainment Software Association which focused more on publisher rights, in light of its support of SOPA. Red 5 Studios' website went offline on January 18 to draw attention to the legislation.

Voxelnauts and creation of MEK Entertainment
After being removed as CEO of Red 5 Studios, Mark Kern raised $1,000,000 in seed funding with his new company, MEK Entertainment, to create a VR game called Voxelnauts. This project and company are now defunct.

EM-8ER

In 2016, Kern created a petition on change org. This petition was claimed to be an effort to gauge support to make a spiritual successor to his previous failed game, Firefall. A preexisting company created by another individual, called Crixa Labs LLC, will release anything related to EM-8ER, like the tabletop role-playing game, Gatestriders, set within the same universe. EM-8ER is a massively multiplayer online game set on the planet of the same name, where players control Gatestriders, humans with technological advancements such as their MEK suits and Thumper MEK/As. They fight against an ancient alien race called Tsi-hu and their giant Kaiju. The goal of the game is to build bases, terraform, mine for resources and fight invasions. The game is in its early stages, with some demo builds shown to backers, however the Kickstarter has been coming soon for years, but has yet to arrive.

Within the past few years Mark Kern began selling scantily-clad female character skins. He refers to them as Waifu, which he states are one of three pillars of Em-8ER. Waifu were not a noteworthy feature of Firefall.

Em8-ER crowdfunded a playable mockup for their kickstarter successfully on Jul 5, 2017. Despite this and additional website crowdfunding and a monthly subscription program, the playable mockup has not been completed over 5 years later.

Career history
 Way of the Warrior (1994), Naughty Dog.
 Star Reach (1994), Interplay Entertainment Corp.
 StarCraft (1998), Blizzard Entertainment Inc.
 StarCraft: Brood War (1998), Blizzard Entertainment Inc.
 StarCraft 64 (2000), Nintendo of America Inc.
 Diablo II (2000), Blizzard Entertainment Inc.
 Warcraft III: The Frozen Throne (2003), Blizzard Entertainment Inc.
 World of Warcraft (2004), Blizzard Entertainment Inc.
 Firefall (2014), Red 5 Studios

References

External links
 Mark E. Kern's entry at MobyGames
 
 EM-8ER

Video game designers
Boston University School of Law alumni
Living people
Year of birth missing (living people)
Blizzard Entertainment people